Travis Dunlap (born September 22, 1985) is an American politician who served in the Oklahoma House of Representatives from the 10th district from 2014 to 2018.

On August 28, 2018, he was defeated in the Republican primary for the 10th district.

References

1985 births
Living people
Republican Party members of the Oklahoma House of Representatives